Nationality words link to articles with information on the nation's poetry or literature (for instance, Irish or France).

Events

Works published in English

United Kingdom
 Matthew Arnold, Empedocles on Etna, and Other Poems
 Alfred Tennyson, Ode on the Death of the Duke of Wellington

United States
 Thomas Holley Chivers, The Death of the Devil, A Serio-Ludicro, Tragico-Comico, Nigero-Whiteman Extravaganza
 Oliver Wendell Holmes Sr., The Poetical Works of Oliver Wendell Holmes
 Richard Realf, Guesses at the Beautiful
 Richard Henry Stoddard, Poems

Works published in other languages

France
 Théophile Gautier's Emaux et camées
 Leconte de Lisle, Poèmes antiques
 Gérard de Nerval, et Les illuminés

Other
 Andreas Munch, Sorg og Trøst, Norwegian
 Theodor Storm, Gedichte ("Poems"), Germany

Births
Death years link to the corresponding "[year] in poetry" article:
 February 24 – George Moore (died 1933) Irish novelist, short-story writer, poet, art critic, memoirist and dramatist
 March 15 – Lady Gregory (died 1932), Irish dramatist, folklorist and poet
 March 22 – Francis William Bourdillon (died 1921), English poet and translator
 April 23 –  Edwin Markham (died 1940), American poet
 June 17 – M. A. Bayfield (died 1922), English classical scholar and writer on poetry
 October 31 – Mary E. Wilkins Freeman (died 1930), American novelist and poet
 November 10 – Henry van Dyke (died 1933), American author, poet, educator and clergyman
Also:
 Ganesh Janardan Agasha (died 1919), Indian, Marathi-language poet and literary critic
 Emma Maria Caillard
 Moyinkutty Vaidyar (died 1891), Indian, Malayalam-language poet

Deaths
Birth years link to the corresponding "[year] in poetry" article:
 February 17 – Micah Joseph Lebensohn (born 1828), Lithuanian Jewish, Hebrew language poet (tuberculosis) 
 February 25 – Thomas Moore (born 1779), Irish-born poet and songwriter
 April 10 – John Howard Payne (born 1791), American actor, playwright, author and consul in Tunis (1842–1852); most  remembered as creator of "Home! Sweet Home!"
 April 25 – Álvares de Azevedo (born 1831), Brazilian Ultra-Romantic poet and writer (tuberculosis)
 May 3 – Sara Coleridge (born 1802), English writer
 November 15 – John Hamilton Reynolds (born 1794), English poet, satirist, critic and playwright

See also

 19th century in poetry
 19th century in literature
 List of years in poetry
 List of years in literature
 Victorian literature
 French literature of the 19th century
 Poetry

Notes

19th-century poetry
Poetry